Hector J. Cyre (October 25, 1901 – August 5, 1971) was an American football tackle, guard, and end for the Green Bay Packers and New York Yankees of the National Football League (NFL). He played college football for Gonzaga.

Biography
Cyre was born on October 25, 1901 in Rivière Qui Barre, Alberta. He attended Gonzaga where he played college football. He played ten games, starting six, for the Green Bay Packers in 1926. He also played three games, starting one, for the New York Yankees in 1928. He died on August 5, 1971, in Langley, Washington at 69.

References

External links
 NFL.com profile

1901 births
1971 deaths
Pre-Confederation Alberta people
Canadian players of American football
American football tackles
Green Bay Packers players
New York Yankees (NFL) players
Sportspeople from Alberta
People from Sturgeon County